Boltenia echinata, commonly known as the cactus sea squirt, is a species of tunicate, a marine invertebrate in the genus Boltenia of the family Pyuridae. It is native to the Arctic Ocean and the northern Atlantic Ocean.

Description
The two small siphons are four-lobed and are near the top of the animal. The base is attached to the substrate over a large area. The test is tough and rubbery and bears radially-branching spines, which resemble hairs. The body colour is brown and the siphons may be tinged red, but the sea squirt is very inconspicuous because it is usually covered with silt.

Distribution and habitat
Boltenia echinata occurs in the northern Atlantic Ocean and the Arctic Ocean. The range includes the coasts of Scotland and the Irish Sea, but not southern Britain.

References

Stolidobranchia
Animals described in 1767
Taxa named by Carl Linnaeus